The Keanakakoi eruption was a VEI-4 eruption that occurred from the summit caldera of Kīlauea volcano in or around November 1790. It has been described as the deadliest volcanic eruption in what is now the United States, with more than 400 people having been killed in the event. The eruption deposited the Keanakakoi Ash which surrounds the Kīlauea Caldera.

Three eruptive phases define the Keanakakoi eruption, all of which were separated by quiescent spells. The first phase was phreatomagmatic, and involved the deposition of fine-grained, well-bedded volcanic ash. A Strombolian-style scoria fall deposit and phreatomagmatic ash similar to that of the first phase were deposited during the second phase. The third and final phase was phreatic and produced interbedded pyroclastic fallout and surge deposits.

See also
1790 Footprints

References

Kīlauea
18th-century volcanic events
Natural disasters in Hawaii
1790 in Hawaii
VEI-4 eruptions
Volcanic eruptions in the United States
Phreatomagmatic eruptions
Strombolian eruptions
Phreatic eruptions
18th-century disasters in Oceania